Brian Gleeson may refer to:

 Brian Gleeson (actor) (born 1987), Irish actor
 Brian Gleeson (footballer) (born 1934), Australian rules footballer